Antonín Mlejnský (born 17 May 1973, in Czechoslovakia) is a Czech former football player. He made one international appearance for the Czech Republic national football team and won the 1998–99 Gambrinus liga with AC Sparta Prague.

References

External links
 
 Idnes profile

1973 births
Living people
Czech footballers
Czech Republic international footballers
Czech First League players
AC Sparta Prague players
FK Viktoria Žižkov players
Association football defenders
Footballers from Prague